Korrozia Metalla (Коррозия Металла, Russian for "Corrosion of metal",) is a Russian (formerly Soviet) thrash metal band led by Sergey "Pauk" Troitsky. It is best known for black humour lyrics and provocative public performances.

Biography

Korrozia was founded in 1984 in Moscow by bass guitarist and vocalist Sergey Troitsky, better known under stage name Pauk (Russian for "spider"). All other members of the band have also taken stage names: Boar (Sergey Vysokosov) - guitars, lead vocals; Schizophrenic - vocals; Clutch (Roman Lebedev) - guitars; Saxon (Vadim Mikhailov) - bass guitar; Morgue - drums. The band's first live show was illegally carried out in an apartment house basement. Annoyed by their noise, the neighbours called for police, which forced Korrozia to leave the stage. Shortly after this incident, they released their first single, a six-song cassette titled Vlast zla (The Power of Evil). The master tapes were lost, but the single kept circulating and eventually a high-quality second generation dub was given to Troitsky in 2001.

Next year the band joined Moscow Rock Lab, which allowed the band to perform rock music legally. The band's first album, Orden Satany (Order of the Satan) was released in 1988. No Soviet state label was ready to release that kind of music, so Pauk created his own one, Hard Rock Corporation (HRC, Korporatsia Tyazhologo Roka, KTR, or КТР in Cyrillic). Before the album was recorded, Schizophrenic was fired and since then Boar performed vocals as well as guitar. Morgue was replaced by Yasher (Lizard). Orden Satany presented a raw thrash metal with heavy hardcore punk influence, the so-called crossover thrash.

In late Soviet years, censorship was lifted, and Korrozia became notorious for lyrics and imagery that, although consistent with western shock rock traditions, were quite provocative by Soviet Russia's measures. For their live shows, they employed strip girls to dance on stage and decorated it with pyrotechnics and "satanic" imagery. Similarly, the band's lyrics consisted of black humour and strong language, describing violence, supernatural and sex. Korrozia Metalla albums were named Cannibal (1990) or Sadism (1992), and their 'trademark' songs include such titles as Vampire's Panzer , AIDS, Eat in the Flesh, Dead Rasputin.

In 90s, Pauk eventually fired all the original line-up and both band’s lyrics and live performances changed to reflect an affinity with fascism and neo-nazism. During the promotional tour for Computer Hitler album, Korrozia even employed world-famous politics and dictators impersonators for their extreme live shows. Pauk indicated his interest in politics when nominated himself for mayor of Moscow in 1993, and for mayor of Khimki in 2012 with a good sense of black humor as well. The band has long been associated with far-right political leanings; several of their songs have been banned and they are included in Russia's federal list of extremist materials in Russia for inciting inter-ethnic hatred.

Korrozia's songs were covered by the number of artists. The band's best known song, Russian Vodka, was covered by Koldbrann and Aggressor.

At the beginning of 2016, due to the local law, Korrozia Metalla's discography was removed from iTunes and Google Play Music. The only tracks that remain are three tracks from a compilations "Russian Metal Ballads" (the only Korrozia tracks available to Russian iTunes users) and the album "Samogon" (eng. "Moonshine") (which can only be purchased in the West).

On 3 September 2016, Troitsky was arrested in Montenegro after the house he was staying at burned down and was facing a sentence of 5 years in prison, however Troitsky was sentenced to 10 months, of which he served 6.

On 28 April 2017, Troitsky returned to Russia and performed with Korrozia at the Mona Club, at a special concert called "Rock Against NATO".

Discography

Studio albums 
 Orden Satany (Order of Satan, 1988/1991)
 Russian Vodka (1989/1993)
 President (1990, cassette demo of Cannibal)
 Kannibal (Cannibal, 1990-1991)
 Sadizm (Sadism, 1992)
 1.966 (1995)
 Kompyuter-Gitler (Computer-Hitler, 1997)
 Yazycheskie bogi (Pagan Gods, 2002)
 Belye volki (White Wolves, 2004)
 Voina mirov (War of the Worlds, 2010)
 666 Like (2014)
 Boginya morga (Goddess of the Morgue, 2018)

The first four albums were initially circulated on cassette tape and reel-to-reel among fans and sold at concerts. The band lost the master tapes and eventually wound up re-recording both albums, releasing them in 1991 and 1993 respectively. Kannibal was released on vinyl in 1991 by Sintez Records.

Live albums 
 Жизнь в Октябре (Life in October, 1987 [recorded 1987])
 Дебош в Орлёнке (Party Hard in Orlenok, 1996 [recorded 1990])
 Live in Sexton FOZD Nightclub & Officers' Culture House. (1995, included in Nicht Kapituliren maxi-single [recorded 1993-1995])
 Адский концерт (Hellish Concert, 1997)
 Угар в Полярном (Party Hard in Polyarny (1998, included Niger)
 Съешь живьём (Eat in the Flesh, 2005)

Singles 
 Vlast zla (The Power of Evil, 1985)
 Nicht Kapituliren (Don't Give Up, 1995, included Live in Sexton FOZD Nightclub & Officers' Culture House [recorded 1995])
 Задержите поезд (Stop the Train, 1996)
 Человек со шрамом (Man with Scar, 1998)
 Нигер (Niger, 1998, included Party Hard in Polyarny)
 Он не любил учителей (He Didn't Like the Teachers, 1999)
 Глаза вампира (The Eyes of the Vampire, 2002)

A demo tape called "Vii" (Вий) from 1982 is also rumoured to exist.

Literature
Michael Moynihan, Didrik Söderlind: Lords of Chaos: Satanischer Metal: Der blutige Aufstieg aus dem Untergrund. Index Verlag, 2004, S. 343.

See also
 Anthrax
 Destruction
 Sodom

External links

 Official Website
 MySpace
 Korrozia Metalla at Metal Archives
 Korrozia Metalla at Discogs

References

Soviet heavy metal musical groups
Musical groups from Moscow
Russian heavy metal musical groups
Russian thrash metal musical groups
Musical groups established in 1982